Frank Dancevic was the defending champion, but decided to compete for the Philadelphia Freedoms of the World TeamTennis instead.

Hiroki Moriya won the title, defeating Fabrice Martin 7–5, 6–7(4–7), 6–3 in the final.

Seeds

Draw

Finals

Top half

Bottom half

References
Main Draw
Qualifying Draw

Challenger Banque Nationale de Granby
Challenger de Granby